The 13th constituency of the Pas-de-Calais was a former French legislative constituency which existed until 2012. It was one of 14 French legislative constituencies in the Pas-de-Calais department (62) located in the Nord-Pas-de-Calais region.

Geographic and demographic description 
The department of Pas-de-Calais had fourteen constituencies.  The thirteenth constituency of Pas-de-Calais was made up of:

 town of Billy-Montigny
 Commune of Fouquières-lès-Lens
 town of Lens
 Municipality of Loison-sous-Lens
 town of Noyelles-sous-Lens
 town of Sallaumines
Source: Official Journal of October 14-15, 1958.

Since 1998 
The thirteenth constituency of Pas-de-Calais was delimited as an electoral division by law n°86-1197 of the November 24, 1986. It includes the following administrative divisions : Cantons of Harnes, Lens Est, Lens Nord-Est, Lens Nord-Ouest.

According to the general census of the population in 1999 , carried out by the Institut national de la statistique et des études économiques (INSEE), the population of this district was estimated at 105,072 inhabitants.

Election results

2007

Sources
 Official results of French elections from 1998:

References 

Defunct French legislative constituencies
French legislative constituencies of Pas-de-Calais